Tarat may refer to:
Tarat, Algeria, a village in Illizi Province, Algeria
Tarat, Malaysia, a village in Sarawak, Malaysia
Tarat (state constituency), represented in the Sarawak State Legislative Assembly
Tarat, Russia, a rural locality (a selo) in Megino-Kangalassky District of the Sakha Republic, Russia